Geriatric psychiatry, also known as geropsychiatry, psychogeriatrics or psychiatry of old age, is a branch of medicine and a subspecialty of psychiatry dealing with the study, prevention, and treatment of neurodegenerative, cognitive impairment, and mental disorders in people of old age. Geriatric psychiatry as a subspecialty has significant overlap with the specialties of geriatric medicine, behavioural neurology, neuropsychiatry, neurology, and general psychiatry. Geriatric psychiatry has become an official subspecialty of psychiatry with a defined curriculum of study and core competencies.

History

Origins 

The origins of geriatric psychiatry began with Alois Alzheimer, a German psychiatrist and neuropathologist who first identified amyloid plaques and neurofibrillary tangles in a fifty-year-old woman he called Auguste D. These plaques and tangles were later identified as being responsible for her behavioural symptoms, short-term memory loss, and psychiatric symptoms. These brain anomalies would become identifiers of what later became known as Alzheimer's disease.

Subspecialty 
The subspecialty of geriatric psychiatry originated in the United Kingdom in the 1950s.

Naming 
The geropsychiatric unit, the term for a hospital-based geriatric psychiatry program, was first introduced in 1984 by Norman White MD, when he opened New England's first specialized program at a community hospital in Rochester, New Hampshire. White is a pioneer in geriatric psychiatry, being among the first psychiatrists nationally to achieve board certification in the field. The prefix psycho- had been proposed for the geriatric program, but White, knowing New Englanders' aversion to anything psycho- lobbied successfully for the name geropsychiatric rather than psychogeriatrics.

Diseases 
Diseases and disorders diagnosed or managed by geriatric psychiatrists include:
 Dementia
 Mild cognitive impairment
 Alzheimer's disease
 Vascular dementia
 Dementia with Lewy bodies
 Parkinson's disease
 Neuropsychiatric complications from stroke, multiple sclerosis
 Late-life presentations of psychiatric disorders
 Depression
 Melancholic depression
 Anxiety disorders
 Bipolar disorder
 Schizophrenia
 Personality disorders
 Medical-Psychiatric Disorders
 Delirium
 Catatonia
 Substance use disorder

Geriatric Psychiatrist 

A geriatric psychiatrist is a physician who specializes in the field of medical sub-specialty called geriatric psychiatrist. A geriatric psychiatrist holds a board certification after specialized training after attaining a medical degree, residency, and an additional geriatric psychiatry fellowship training program. The requirements may vary by countries. Geriatric psychiatrist are also psychiatrists who are qualified in the general diagnosis and treatment of psychiatric disorders. Some geriatric psychiatrists also conduct research to determine the cause and better treatments for neurodegenerative disorders and late-life mental health disorders.

Geriatric psychiatrists may perform neurological examinations, mental status examination, laboratory investigations, neuroimaging, cognitive assessments to investigate the causes of psychiatric or neurologic symptoms in old age.

Training

International 
The International Psychogeriatric Association is an international community of scientists and healthcare geriatric professionals working for mental health in aging. International Psychogeriatrics is the official journal of the International Psychogeriatric Association.

Canada 
The Royal College of Physicians and Surgeons of Canada is responsible for training and certifying geriatric psychiatrists in Canada. Geriatric psychiatry requires an additional year of subspecialty fellowship training in addition to general psychiatry training.

United Kingdom 
The Royal College of Psychiatrists is responsible for training and certifying psychiatrists in the United Kingdom. Within the Royal College of Psychiatrists, the Faculty of Old Age Psychiatry is responsible for training in Old Age Psychiatry. Doctors who have membership of the Royal College of Psychiatrists can undertake a three or four-year training programme to become a specialist in Old Age Psychiatry. There is currently a shortage of old age psychiatrists in the United Kingdom.

United States 
The American Association for Geriatric Psychiatry (AAGP) is the national organization representing health care providers specializing in late life mental disorders. The American Journal of Geriatric Psychiatry is the official journal of the AAGP. The American Board of Psychiatry and Neurology and the American Osteopathic Board of Neurology and Psychiatry both issue a board certification in geriatric psychiatry.

After a 4-year residency in psychiatry, a psychiatrist can complete a one-year fellowship in geriatric psychiatry. Many fellowships in geriatric psychiatry exist.

See also
 Geriatrics
 GERRI

References

External links

 
Geriatrics